The minister-president of Hesse, also referred to as the premier or minister-president (also translated into English as the prime minister of Hessen), is the head of government of the German state of Hesse. The position in its current form was created in 1946, when the provisional state of Greater Hesse was renamed. Greater Hesse had been formed in 1945 after the Second World War from the Prussian Provinces of Kurhessen and Nassau (formed from the Prussian Province of Hesse-Nassau in 1944) and the People's State of Hesse. The current minister-president is Volker Bouffier, heading a coalition government between the Christian Democrats and the Greens. Bouffier succeeded Roland Koch following his departure from active politics.

The office of the minister-president is known as the State Chancellery and is located in the capital of Wiesbaden, along with the rest of the cabinet departments.

The state of Hesse sees itself in the tradition notably of the Grand Duchy of Hesse and the People's State of Hesse (colloquially known as "Hesse-Darmstadt"), having adopted many of its symbols.

List

Grand Duchy of Hesse (1819–1918) 
 Ministers-president of the Grand Duchy of Hesse
1819–1829: Carl Ludwig Wilhelm Grolman
1829–1848: Karl du Thil
1848: Heinrich von Gagern
1848–1850: Heinrich Karl Jaup
1852–1871: Reinhard Carl Friedrich von Dalwigk
1871–1872: Friedrich von Lindelof
1872–1876: Karl von Hofmann
1876–1884: Julius Rinck von Starck
1884–1898: Jacob Finger
1898–1906: Karl Rothe
1906–1918: Christian Wilhelm Karl Ewald

People's State of Hesse (1919–1945) 
Political party:

Hesse (1945–present) 
 Minister-President of the State of Hesse
Political party:

See also
List of rulers of Hesse

References

External links 
State Chancellery

Ministers-President of Hesse
Hesse
Politics of Hesse
Ministers-President